Speak for the Trees  is a non-profit based in Boston, Massachusetts. The organization was co-founded in 2018 by David Meshoulam and Amanda Rich. Speak for the Trees' main missions are to maintain and improve the urban tree canopy in the  city of Boston, focusing on neighborhoods with less tree coverage. Speak for the Trees works to improve the urban tree canopy through tree giveaways, tree plantings, and tree inventorying.

Tree Giveaways 
In the spring and fall seasons Speak for the Trees works with Boston residents to provide them trees they can plant on their private property. From 2019 on Speak for the Trees has given out over 1,000 trees free of charge to the people of Boston. Some of the trees Speak for the Trees has given away are the northern redbud, the yoshino cherry, and the red oak. Along with giving away free trees the Speak for the Trees also works to teach tree recipients how to care for their new tree. Over the past 3 years Speak for the Trees has given out trees to a variety of neighborhoods in Boston such as Hyde Park, East Boston, Mattapan, Roxbury, and Allston.

TUTC (Teen Urban Tree Corps) 
The Teen Urban Tree Corps is a summer program run by Speak for the Trees in collaboration with the city of Boston. The group of teens goes around the city of Boston measuring tree pits, identifying tree species, and inventorying trees. In the summer of 2019 TUTC was able to inventory around 3,800 trees and 600 empty tree pits where new trees could be planted, which was all documented in Open Tree Map. In the following summers the Teen Urban tree corps has also created videos and infographics to spread information about Boston neighborhoods' tree canopies as well as continuing to inventory and maintain trees.

Notable Visitors 
The work of the Teen Urban Tree Corps also brought the group of teens some visitors. The Teen Urban Tree Corps was able to meet with environmental activists and politicians from across the city. Some notable names include Massachusetts' U.S. Representative Ayanna Pressley, former Boston city councilwoman Anissa Essaibi George, and former Boston city councilwoman and current Boston mayor Michelle Wu. Other guests such as local leader Mariama White-Hammond and Boston Parks and Recreation's Commissioner Ryan Woods have also visited.

References 

Wikipedia Student Program